The Swedish Institute for Standards (SIS) , is an independent organization, founded in 1922, with members from the private and public sector.

Activities
SIS and its members develop standards within different domains, including construction, safety, healthcare, consumer products, management systems, engineering, environmental issues and safety. SIS participates in the European and global network which develops international standards. SIS is a member of the European cooperative effort CEN as well as the global ISO. SIS was founded in 1922.

Earlier on, the SIS logotype was often used for indicating that a tool was compliant with Swedish standards, but lately this has been replaced with the CE mark.

Sources

See also
 International Organization for Standardization (ISO)
 European Committee for Standardization (CEN)
 Svenska Elektriska Kommissionen
 Terminologicentrum (TNC)

External links 

SSR
CEN
ISO

ISO member bodies
Non-profit organizations based in Sweden
Organizations established in 1922
1922 establishments in Sweden